15 August is a 2001 French film directed and written by Patrick Alessandrin.

Plot
Some middle aged men quickly have a crisis on their hands when their wives depart leaving them to look after the boisterous kids.

Cast
 Richard Berry as Max 
 Charles Berling as Vincent 
 Jean-Pierre Darroussin as Raoul 
 Mélanie Thierry as Julie 
 Selma El Mouissi as Nina, Max's daughter 
 Manon Gaurin as Alice, Max's daughter
 Quentin Pommier as Arnold, Vincent's son
 Thomas Goulard as Sébastien, Vincent's son 
 Ludmila Mikaël as Louise Abel 
  as Stéphanie 
 Annette Merchandou as Madame André 
 Marie-Christine Demares as Madame Michaud
  as Fabrice
 Serge Hazanavicius as Loïc
 Catherine Hosmalin as neighbour 
 Dimitri Radochevitch as neighbour 
 Luc Sonzogni as swimming monitor
 Gianni Giardinelli as Julie's boyfriend

References

External links 
 
 15 August at Cinema-francais.fr

2001 films
2000s French-language films
2001 comedy-drama films
Films directed by Patrick Alessandrin
French comedy-drama films
2000s French films